The Jardin botanique universitaire de Poitiers (33 hectares) is a botanical garden and arboretum maintained by the University of Poitiers. It is located at 443 Route du deffend, Mignaloux-Beauvoir, Vienne, Nouvelle-Aquitaine, France, and open daily without charge.

The garden is located on the former domaine du Deffend, which was purchased by the state in 1962 and in 1996 established as a regional plant heritage center. It was named a botanical garden in 2005 with the following missions:

 conservation of regional plants by developing thematic gardens (fruits, vegetables, etc.)
 education and public awareness
 supporting university research
 preservation of heritage collections of the University of Poitiers, including a herbarium dating to the nineteenth century,

Today the garden contains two small forests (6 hectares), two ponds, a farm dating to the nineteenth century, and a 17th-century dovecote. Its arboretum contains 90 oak taxa, as well as a good collection of heritage apple trees. Other collections include local orchids, aquatic plants, and medicinal plants.

See also 
 List of botanical gardens in France

References 
 Observatoire Régional de l'Environnement de Poitou-Charentes
 Parcs et Jardins entry (French)
 Gralon entry (French)
 University of Poitiers description (French)

Gardens in Poitiers
Poitiers, Jardin botanique universitaire de
University of Poitiers